George Morgan Trefgarne, 1st Baron Trefgarne (né George Garro-Jones; 14 September 1894 – 27 September 1960), was a Welsh Liberal and later Labour politician, barrister, businessman and editor of the Daily Dispatch.

Background

George Garro-Jones was born in Haverfordwest, Wales, on 14 September 1894. He was a "child of the Manse" as his father was the Congregationalist Minister at Zion's Hill Chapel, Spittal. His father, Reverend David Garro-Jones, trained for the ministry at Brecon College and served Congregational churches across Wales. The walk from the Manse in Spittal towards Zion's Hill chapel has views across a deep gorge to Treffgarne Rocks and it is understood this is where the titled name of Lord Trefgarne originated.

Political career
Garro-Jones was private secretary to Sir Hamar Greenwood from 1919 to 1922 while Greenwood was firstly Secretary for Overseas Trade and then Chief Secretary for Ireland. Greenwood was a Liberal Minister in the Coalition Government led by David Lloyd George.

This close association led Garro-Jones into standing as a candidate for National Liberals at the 1922 general election. He was selected to contest Bethnal Green North East, where the sitting Liberal member, who also supported the Coalition Government, was retiring. However, Garro-Jones's task of holding the seat became harder when the National Liberals coalition partners, the Unionists, decided to end the coalition and he found a Unionist intervening against him. To make matters worse, he could not count on the support of the local Liberal Association when an opposition Liberal supporter of H. H. Asquith also entered the contest. As a result, he was listed last in the election results.

After the election, the divisions in the Liberal ranks between the supporters of Asquith and Lloyd George was healed. Garro-Jones was chosen as Liberal candidate at the 1923 general election for the Unionist seat of Hackney South. No Liberal candidate had fought in the constituency at the previous election, so it was not considered a particularly good prospect. The Labour candidate won, but Garro-Jones was still able to poll more votes than the sitting member who came third.

Garro-Jones only had to wait another year for the opportunity to stand for parliament again. Once again, he was chosen as Liberal candidate for Hackney South. However, this time, there was no Unionist candidate and he was able to gain the seat from his Labour opponent.

His victory was rare in an election which saw a very many Liberals lose their seats. He stood down at the 1929 election and shortly afterwards joined the Labour Party. He was elected Labour MP for Aberdeen North at the 1935 general election, holding the seat until 1945.

Garro-Jones was raised to the peerage as Baron Trefgarne, of Cleddau in the County of Pembroke, on 21 January 1947. In 1954, he assumed by deed poll the surname of Trefgarne in lieu of his patronymic. He was succeeded by his son David, a Conservative government minister.

Electoral history

Arms

References

External links
 
 

1894 births
1960 deaths
Hackney Members of Parliament
Labour Party (UK) hereditary peers
Liberal Party (UK) MPs for English constituencies
Members of the Parliament of the United Kingdom for Aberdeen constituencies
Ministers in the Churchill wartime government, 1940–1945
National Liberal Party (UK, 1922) politicians
Scottish Labour MPs
UK MPs 1924–1929
UK MPs 1935–1945
Barons created by George VI